Spring is a 2014 American romantic body horror film directed by Justin Benson and Aaron Moorhead and starring Lou Taylor Pucci and Nadia Hilker. The film follows Evan, a young man who travels to Italy and pursues a woman named Louise who, unbeknownst to Evan, harbors a dangerous secret.

Spring premiered at the Toronto International Film Festival on September 5, 2014, before receiving a limited theatrical release through Drafthouse Films on March 20, 2015. The film received positive reviews from critics and grossed $49,970 worldwide.

Plot 
Evan Russell, a young American man, loses his mother to cancer. The next day, following his mother's funeral, he gets into a physical altercation with another man while drinking at the restaurant he works at, resulting in the loss of his job. His friend advises him to travel to get his mind clear. Evan travels to Italy and meets a flirtatious girl named Louise. He is initially suspicious of her but becomes more interested. To pursue his relationship with Louise he takes a job at a local farm and starts living in a small town in southern Italy.

Louise, who initially rejected Evan, finally has sex with him without using a condom. The next morning she wakes up before he does and has a monstrous appearance and leaves, killing a cat. When Evan is wandering the town later, he catches sight of Louise and talks to her again. They later explore the town together. After a few dates, Louise asks Evan about his family story. Although he is reluctant to reveal details, he relents and then asks Louise to tell him something about her. Louise takes out the contact lens from her right eye to show Evan that she has heterochromia. Evan sees the same condition reflected in the women on many of the paintings in the museum and also on the cover of a book. One night, Louise is having dinner with Evan when her skin condition starts getting worse. She runs off the street and is followed by a tourist who mistakes her for a prostitute. Louise unwillingly kills him after she mutates into a reptilian creature.

Evan, who has been working illegally on the farm, has to leave when immigration police make a visit there. As he has nowhere to go, he goes to Louise's house. The door is chain-locked, through which he sees blood on the floor and hears a strange voice. He breaks the chain to open the door and finds an octopus-like creature on the floor wearing Louise's dress, trying to reach a syringe. He quickly picks up the syringe and injects it into the creature's neck.

Louise reveals to Evan that she's a 2,000-year-old mutant. She is the woman in all of the paintings of women with dual eye color, including the one on the cover of the book. Every 20 years in spring she gets herself pregnant, and then her body uses cells in the embryo she carries to recreate her while she changes into different creatures during the process. Evan is shocked and leaves. Louise follows him and keeps telling him more about the condition. She reveals that she did not use a condom during intercourse with Evan in order to purposely get pregnant. She also reveals that if she falls in love with someone, her body will produce oxytocin, a hormone which will keep embryo cells from consumption, resulting in the loss of her immortality. Evan asks if she is in love with him, to which she replies she is not and also that she would not give up her immortality for anyone.

Evan then asks her to spend her last 24 hours with him before she re-evolves. They spend all night talking to each other. In the early morning Louise takes Evan to the ruins of Pompeii, where she was born, and tells him her family history. The time comes and Evan makes one last attempt begging her not to change, to which Louise replies that she does not control it, her body does, and it has started to change, meaning she may attack Evan. He refuses to go, so Louise lies down with her head on his lap and she begins to change, while listening to Evan talk about the experience of being mortal and all the positive aspects to it. The sun rises before a calm and resigned Evan looks down at Louise when a grotesque sound is heard. However, he finds Louise still in her current human form while the volcano that resulted in the death of Louise’s family is seen to begin erupting in the background.

Cast
Lou Taylor Pucci as Evan Russell
Nadia Hilker as Louise
Francesco Carnelutti as Angelo
Nick Nevern as Thomas
Chris Palko as Bancroft Dawson
Jonathan Silvestri as Sam
Jeremy Gardner as Tommy
Vinny Curran as Mike
Holly Hawkins as Nicole Russell, Evan's Mom
Augie Duke as Jackie
Vanessa Bednar as Gail
Shane Brady as Brad

Soundtrack
The film's soundtrack was composed by Jimmy Lavalle. The soundtrack was released on March 25, 2015 by Lavalle's own label, Eastern Glow Recordings.

Release
Spring premiered on September 5, 2014 as part of the Toronto International Film Festival. The film received a limited theatrical release on March 20, 2015 through Drafthouse Films and a video on demand release a day later through FilmBuff.

Critical reception
The film received positive reviews from critics. Review aggregator Rotten Tomatoes reports a rating of 85% based on 60 reviews, with a weighted average score of 7.40/10; the site's critics' consensus states: "Rich in atmosphere and intelligence, Spring is a singular horror film with a sneaky, lingering impact." On Metacritic, the film has a normalized score of 70% from 13 critics, indicating "generally favorable reviews".

Jon Dickinson of SCREAM: The Horror Magazine gave Spring a 5 star rating, stating that it "transcends all genres to deliver a story that feels entirely unique…a monster you won’t want to miss."

Mexican filmmaker Guillermo del Toro has highly praised the film, stating that "[Spring] is one of the best horror films of this decade." He added that it is one of the only Lovecraftian films "that has blown me away."

Accolades
Austin Fantastic Fest
Next Wave Award for Lou Taylor Pucci as Best Actor

Palm Springs International Film Festival
Directors to Watch for Justin Benson & Aaron Moorhead

References

External links
Drafthouse Films official site

2014 films
2014 horror films
2010s science fiction horror films
2014 multilingual films
American science fiction horror films
2010s Italian-language films
Films about shapeshifting
Films shot in Italy
Films shot in Los Angeles
American body horror films
Films directed by Aaron Moorhead
Films directed by Justin Benson
2010s English-language films
2010s American films
American multilingual films
Italian-language American films